Eduard Mikhailovich Sagalaev is a Russian television journalist and media manager.

President of the National Association of Broadcasters. Member of the Russian Academy of Television.

Founder (with Ted Turner) of TV-6 - first commercial television station in Russia.

On February 15, 1996 to February 10, 1997 - Chairman All-Russia State Television and Radio Broadcasting Company.

Winner of USSR State Prize (1978), Order For Merit to the Fatherland  3rd (2011) and  4th (2006) classes, Order of Friendship (1996).

References

External links
 Яндекс. Пресс-портрет
  Лучшие люди России

1946 births
Living people
People from Samarkand
Recipients of the Order "For Merit to the Fatherland", 3rd class
Recipients of the USSR State Prize
Communist Party of the Soviet Union members
Russian mass media owners
Academicians of the Russian Academy of Cinema Arts and Sciences "Nika"
Members of the Civic Chamber of the Russian Federation
Soviet journalists
Russian journalists